Weyburn was a former provincial electoral district for the Legislative Assembly of the Canadian province of Saskatchewan, from 1908 to 1995.

The district was created for the second Saskatchewan general election in 1908. It contained the town of Weyburn and extended into the surrounding countryside.

The district was dissolved in the redistribution following the 1991 federal census. It was combined with parts of the Bengough-Milestone district to become Weyburn-Big Muddy, for the 1995 general election.

From 1944 to 1961, Premier Tommy Douglas was the Member of the Legislative Assembly for the Weyburn riding.

Members of the Legislative Assembly

Election results

General Election, 1908 

 Elected.

General election, 1912 

 Elected.
X Incumbent.

General election, 1917 

 Elected.
X Incumbent.

By-election, 1919 

The by-election was called when the incumbent, Robert Menzies Mitchell, resigned to take the position of superintendent of the Saskatchewan Hospital in Weyburn.
 Elected.

By-election, 1920 

The by-election was called when Hamilton accepted the position of Minister of Agriculture in the Cabinet of Premier Martin, an office of profit under the Crown, on April 26, 1920.
 Elected.
X Incumbent.

General election, 1921 

 Elected.
X Incumbent.

General election, 1925 

 Elected.
X Incumbent.

General election, 1929 

 Elected.
X Incumbent.

General election, 1934 

 Elected.
X Incumbent.

General election, 1938 

 Elected.
X Incumbent.

General election, 1944 

 Elected.

General election, 1948 

 Elected.
X Incumbent.

General election, 1952 

 Elected.
X Incumbent.

General election, 1956 

 Elected.
X Incumbent. 
1 Rounding error.

General election, 1960 

 Elected.
X Incumbent. 
1 Rounding error.

By-election, 1961 

The by-election was called when the incumbent, Premier Douglas, resigned from the provincial Legislative Assembly to enter federal politics.
 Elected.

General election, 1964 

 Elected.
X Incumbent.

General election, 1967 

 Elected.
X Incumbent.

General election, 1971 

 Elected.
X Incumbent.

General election, 1975 

 Elected.
X Incumbent.

General election, 1978 

 Elected.
X Incumbent.

General election, 1982 

 Elected.

General election, 1986 

 Elected.
X Incumbent. 
1 Rounding error.

General election, 1991 

 Elected.
X Incumbent. 
1 Rounding error.

References

External links 

 Saskatchewan Archives:  Saskatchewan Executive and Legislative Directory
 Elections Saskatchewan:  Election Results

Weyburn
Former provincial electoral districts of Saskatchewan